Projovellania is an extinct nautiloid cephalopod belonging to the oncocerid family Jovellaniidae found in mid Silurian sediments in Europe. The shell is a longiconic cyrtocone, like that of Jovellania or Mixosiphonoceras, except for being compressed rather than depressed.

References
 Sweet  W.C. 1964. Nautiloidea-Oncocerida. Treatise on Invertebrate Paleontology, Part K. Geological Society of America and Univ. of Kansas press. Teichert & Moore, (eds)

Prehistoric nautiloid genera
Oncocerida